is a train station located in the city of Hashima, Gifu Prefecture,  Japan, operated by the private railway operator Meitetsu.

Lines

Station layout
Minami Juku Station has two ground-level side platforms connected by a level crossing. The station is unattended.

Platforms

Adjacent stations

History
Minami Juku Station opened on June 25, 1921.

Surrounding area
Azuka Elementary School

See also
 List of Railway Stations in Japan

External links

References

Railway stations in Japan opened in 1921
Stations of Nagoya Railroad
Railway stations in Gifu Prefecture
Hashima, Gifu